Agrupación Deportiva Ceuta Fútbol Club is a Spanish football team based in the autonomous city of Ceuta. Founded in 1956, it plays in Primera División RFEF – Group 1, holding home matches at Estadio Alfonso Murube with a capacity of 6,500 seats.

History
The club was found in 1956, after a merger between Sociedad Deportiva Ceuta and Atlético Tetuán, under the name of Club Atlético de Ceuta. It eventually took the place of Tetuán in Segunda División, remaining in the category for six campaigns.

After a one-year spell in Tercera División, Atlético Ceuta returned to the second level and enjoyed a further five seasons before suffering relegation in 1968. The club subsequently fluctuated between the fourth and fifth levels, staying in the former for a short amount of time.

After being promoted to the fourth division in 2012 due to an administrative relegation, Atlético Ceuta tried to merge with AD Ceuta. However, due to the latter's high debts, the club remained under the same name, but with the staff and players of the Agrupación Deportiva.

In 2013, the club was officially named Agrupación Deportiva Ceuta Fútbol Club, inheriting AD Ceuta's colours and logo.

Club background
Ceuta Sport Club — (1932–41); renamed in 1941 to Sociedad Deportiva Ceuta
Sociedad Deportiva Ceuta — (1941–56); in 1956 merged with the Spanish elements of Club Atlético Tetuán to form  Club Atlético de Ceuta

Club naming
Club Atlético de Ceuta (1956–92)
Ceuta Atlético Club (1992-94)
Club Atlético de Ceuta (1994-2012)
Asociación Deportiva Atlético de Ceuta (2012-13)
Agrupación Deportiva Ceuta Fútbol Club (2013–present)

Other clubs from Ceuta
Club Deportivo Imperio de Ceuta — (1958–)
Agrupación Deportiva Ceuta — (1969–91)
Club Ceutí Atlético – (1996–97)
Asociación Deportiva Ceuta (1997–2012)

Season to season

As Club Atlético de Ceuta

As Agrupación Deportiva Ceuta Fútbol Club

11 seasons in Segunda División
1 season in Primera División RFEF
1 season in Segunda División RFEF
18 seasons in Tercera División

Current squad
.

Youth players

References

External links
Futbolme team profile 
Soccerway team profile
La futbolteca team profile 
Futbol regional profile 

Football clubs in Ceuta
Association football clubs established in 1956
1956 establishments in Spain
Segunda División clubs
Primera Federación clubs
AD Ceuta FC